“Your Love” is a song by the English rock band the Outfield, taken from their 1985 debut album Play Deep, released in early 1986 and written by guitarist John Spinks. In the United States, the song reached number six on the Billboard Hot 100 and number seven on the Album Rock Tracks chart in 1986.

Background
The song was written by Outfield guitarist John Spinks. Spinks was living in east London and invited the vocalist of the band, Tony Lewis, to his flat for a writing session. The two developed "Your Love" on the porch of the flat. Lewis sat on an amplifier and Spinks began writing the opening lyrics. According to Lewis, the song took only twenty minutes to write. The song's lyrics have no basis in reality: "Josie" was not a real person, and the song is an entirely invented story. Afterwards, the band began recording demos for their debut album Play Deep with producer William Wittman, who had also worked with Cyndi Lauper and the Fixx. The initial demo was softer in tone, and Wittman encouraged the band to take a more hard rock approach to its sound. To this end, the group were inspired by the Who, and Lewis's vocal arrangement was heavily inspired by The Police vocalist Sting.

Composition
"Your Love" is an uptempo new wave, power pop and pop rock song sung by lead vocalist Tony Lewis. The lyrics are vague, but imply that the narrator is interested in a girl that he is not in a relationship with, who may be older or younger depending upon how those lyrics are interpreted. The narrator asks her to let him "use her love"; i.e. have a one night stand with him, while his current girlfriend, Josie, is on vacation. In the end, she declines because she wants him to be faithful to Josie.

Critical reception
Rolling Stone contributor Jimmy Guterman wrote that the track "seems to advocate philandering". While Dennis Hunt from the Los Angeles Times criticized the whole of Play Deep as "thoroughly derivative music", he praised the song's "lovely melodic line that's engagingly performed by vocalist Tony Lewis, who has obviously been listening to Journey's Steve Perry".

Chart performance
"Your Love" became a major hit in the United States. It was first promoted as the second single from Play Deep in November 1985, when it was played on album-oriented rock (AOR) radio, to maintain momentum generated by the album's lead single, "Say It Isn't So". After entering the Billboard Top Rock Tracks chart in January 1986 (which measured the playlists of AOR stations across the U.S.), Columbia began expanding the song to top 40 radio in February. It then peaked at number seven on the Top Rock Tracks chart during the week of March 1. The song entered the top ten on the Billboard Hot 100 in May 1986, peaking at number six during the week of May 10. Overall, it spent 22 weeks on the Hot 100.

Music video
The music video has an extended intro and was directed by Jon Jopson. The concept for the clip has the band filming a music video for the song, and prominently features a painting motif (similar to the cover of the album from which the song was taken). They perform in front of a backdrop of the Play Deep album cover, which is also being finger-painted offstage by an artist, played by actress JoAnn Willette. Her character and lead vocalist Tony Lewis appear flirtatious throughout the video. Willette was interviewed about her role on the blog Noblemania in 2013, and gave details about the shoot; it was shot in Astoria, New York on a soundstage over one day.  At the end of the video, Willette can be seen exiting the studio at dawn, the time the production wrapped. The band appears mainly as playing the song, highlighting their unity as a performing band: "We didn't want a situation where they had to be actors or something that wasn't what they are," said the band's manager, Kip Krones, at the time.

The video was first added to MTV's schedule during the week of 19 February 1986, and began attracting major rotation. It peaked at number two on MTV's Top 20 Countdown in late April 1986.

Track listings and formats
 7-inch vinyl
 "Your Love"  – 3:22
 "61 Seconds"  – 4:18
 Japanese 7-inch vinyl
 "Your Love"  – 3:22
 "All the Love in the World"  – 3:33
 United Kingdom 12-inch vinyl
 "Your Love"  – 3:22
 "61 Seconds"  – 4:18
 "Mystery Man"  – 4:04

Credits and personnel
Credits and personnel are adapted from the Play Deep album liner notes.
 John Spinks – writer, guitar, vocals
 Tony Lewis – bass, lead vocals
 Alan Jackman – drums
 Reg Webb – keyboards
 Frank Callaghan – additional vocals
 Bill Wittman – additional vocals, producer, recording, mixing
 Andy Canelle – recording
 John Agnello – mixing
 George Marino – mastering

Charts

Weekly charts

Year-end charts

Certifications

In popular culture
The song received a resurgence in popularity in 2002, due to its inclusion in the game Grand Theft Auto: Vice City.

Colorado Rockies outfielder Charlie Blackmon uses "Your Love" as his walk-up song coming to bat.

In the 2014 film Tammy, “Your Love” is played by the titular character in the opening scene as she drives to work.

The New England Patriots of the NFL play this song at home games in the fourth quarter whenever leading.

References

External links
 
 
 
 
 
 

1986 singles
The Outfield songs
1985 songs
Columbia Records singles
Songs written by John Spinks (musician)